The Toronto Rock are a lacrosse team based in Toronto playing in the National Lacrosse League (NLL). The 2016 season was the 19th in franchise history, and 18th as the Rock.

After an 0–6 start to the season, the Rock were able to turn things around, winning three of four including a 17–6 shelling of the Knighthawks. But the turnaround was temporary, as injuries decimated the team. The Rock only won two more games the rest of the season, finishing out of the playoffs for the first time since 2009.

Regular season

Finalstandings

Game log

Regular season

Roster

Transactions

Trades

Entry Draft
The 2015 NLL Entry Draft took place on September 28, 2015. The Rock made the following selections:

See also
2016 NLL season

References

Toronto
Toronto Rock
2016 in Canadian sports